An Arch-Treasurer is a chief treasurer, specifically the great treasurer of the Holy Roman Empire. The title of Arch-Treasurer was only ceremonially significant, as it was only used in the coronation of Emperors.

History
The office was created in 1648 for Frederick V, Elector Palatine, after he lost his electorate, and title of Imperial Arch-Steward, in February 1623 to Maximilian I, Elector of Bavaria. The electorate was given to Bavaria by the emperor Ferdinand II. The office of Arch-Treasurer passed to the Elector of Hanover in 1777.

References

 

Noble titles
17th century in the Holy Roman Empire
Economy of the Holy Roman Empire
Titles of nobility of the Holy Roman Empire